Luis Hernán Sillero (born June 23, 1978 in Salta) is a retired Argentine football striker. The last professional club he played for is Bolivian side Blooming.

Club career
Sillero started playing professionally at Gimnasia y Tiro de Salta. Later, he had spells with Atlético Tucumán and Atlético Talleres also in Argentina. In 2004, he made his debut in the Liga de Fútbol Profesional Boliviano with Unión Central before joining Wilstermann the following year. In 2006, Sillero relocated to Colombia and signed for Real Cartagena where he played until mid-2007. Then he moved back to Bolivia to defend Bolívar. Next season he transferred to Real Potosí to help the team face both, the domestic tournament and Copa Libertadores. In 2009 Sillero transferred to Universitario. After a year in Sucre, Sillero was signed by Blooming for the 2010 season.

External links
 https://web.archive.org/web/20080408034905/http://www.luissillero.com.ar/
 BDFA profile 
 
 

1978 births
Living people
Association football forwards
Argentine footballers
Argentine expatriate footballers
Torneo Argentino A players
Categoría Primera A players
Bolivian Primera División players
Atlético Tucumán footballers
Gimnasia y Tiro footballers
C.D. Jorge Wilstermann players
Real Cartagena footballers
Club Bolívar players
Club Blooming players
Talleres de Perico footballers
Unión Tarija players
Universitario de Sucre footballers
Expatriate footballers in Colombia
Expatriate footballers in Bolivia
Argentine expatriate sportspeople in Colombia
Argentine expatriate sportspeople in Bolivia
People from Salta
Sportspeople from Salta Province